George Talbot Rice, 3rd Baron Dynevor (Dinefwr) (8 October 1765 – 9 April 1852) was a British peer and politician. He was the son of Cecil de Cardonnel, 2nd Baroness Dynevor and George Rice (or Rhys). He was educated at Westminster School and matriculated at Christ Church, Oxford on 1 February 1783, where he was awarded a Master of Arts degree on 30 May 1786. 

Talbot Rice was the Tory Member of Parliament for Carmarthenshire from 1790 to 1793.  His father had previously been the Tory MP for Carmarthenshire between 1754 and 1779.

He inherited his title in 1793 on the death of his mother. The 3rd Baron's mother had adopted, by royal licence the name of de Cardonnel. In 1817 (again by royal licence) he resumed his paternal surname of Rice. His name is now often hyphenated as Talbot-Rice.

He died on 9 April 1852. On 20 October 1794 he had married Frances Townshend, third daughter of Thomas Townshend, 1st Viscount Sydney of St Leonards. They had 2 sons and 5 daughters and lived at Newton House in his Dynefwr estate near Llandeilo, Carmarthenshire. He was succeeded by his eldest son George, who later adopted the surname of Rice-Trevor.

References

1765 births
1852 deaths
People educated at Westminster School, London
Alumni of Christ Church, Oxford
 03
Rice, George
Rice, George
Rice, George
George
Lord-Lieutenants of Carmarthenshire